Nobody's Son is a 1917 Hungarian film directed by Michael Curtiz.

Plot summary

Cast
 Gyula Csortos
 Dezso Gyarfas
 Hermin Haraszti
 Ica von Lenkeffy
 Károly Lajthay
 József Sziklay

See also
 Michael Curtiz filmography

References

External links
 

Films directed by Michael Curtiz
1917 films
Hungarian black-and-white films
Hungarian silent films
Austro-Hungarian films